Gary L. Marshall is an American farmer, educator and politician in Idaho. Marshall is a Republican member of Idaho House of Representatives for District 30, seat A.

Early life 
Marshall grew up in Osgood, Idaho. Marshall graduated from Bonneville High School in Idaho Falls, Idaho.

Education 
Marshall earned a Bachelor of Arts degree in political science and history from Brigham Young University. Marshall earned a certificate in secondary education from BYU. Marshall earned a master's degree in educational administration from BYU.

Career 
As an educator, Marshall was a teacher and administrator at Idaho Falls Public School District. Marshall was a professor, department chair and division chair at Brigham Young University-Idaho's Ricks College. Marshall was a second dean of  College of Education at Brigham Young University-Idaho.

Marshall is a farmer in Idaho.

On November 6, 2018, Marshall won the election and became a Republican member of Idaho House of Representatives for District 30, seat A. Marshall defeated Pat Tucker with 72.6% of the votes.

Personal life 
Marshall's wife is Ramona Marshall. They have seven children. Marshall and his family live in Idaho Falls, Idaho.

References

External links 
 Gary Marshall at ballotpedia.org

Living people
Republican Party members of the Idaho House of Representatives
People from Idaho Falls, Idaho
Year of birth missing (living people)
21st-century American politicians